Ballina Shire is a local government area in the Northern Rivers region of New South Wales, Australia. The Shire was formed on 1 January 1977 by the amalgamation of the Municipality of Ballina and Tintenbar Shire. The Shire is located adjacent to the Tasman Sea and the Pacific Highway. The council seat is located in the town of Ballina. The population of the Ballina Shire area was 44,208 in June 2018.

The mayor of Ballina Shire Council is Sharon Cadwallader.

Towns and localities

Heritage listings
The Ballina Shire has a number of heritage-listed sites, including:
 High Conservation Value Old Growth forest

Demographics

At the 2016 census, there were  people in the Ballina local government area; of these 48.2 per cent were male and 51.8 per cent were female. Aboriginal and Torres Strait Islander people made up 3.3 per cent of the population, which was higher than the national (2.9%) and state averages (2.8%). The median age of people in the Ballina Shire area was 48 years, which was significantly higher than the national median of 38 years. Children aged 0–14 years made up 16.7 per cent of the population and people aged 65 years and over made up 25.0 per cent of the population. Of people in the area aged 15 years and over, 48.9 per cent were married and 14.4 per cent were either divorced or separated.

When compared with total population growth of Australia for the same periods, being 5.78 per cent and 8.32 per cent respectively, population growth in the Ballina local government area was significantly lower than the national average. Growth increased to a 9.2% increase between 2011 and 2016, compared to a national average of 8.8%.
The median weekly income for residents within the Ballina Shire area was significantly lower than the national average.

At the 2016 census, the proportion of residents in the Ballina local government area who stated their ancestry as Australian or English exceeded 60 per cent of all residents (national average was 48.3 per cent). Nearly 60% of all residents in the Ballina nominated a religious affiliation with Christianity at the 2011 census.  Ballina Shire had a significantly higher proportion of households (89.1 per cent) where English only was spoken at home (national average was 72.7 per cent).

Council

Current composition and election method
Ballina Shire Council is composed of ten Councillors, including the mayor, for a fixed four-year term of office. The mayor is directly elected while the nine other councillors are elected proportionally as three separate wards, each electing three councillors. The most recent election was held on 4 December 2021, and the makeup of the council, including the mayor, is as follows:

The current Council, elected in 2021, in order of election by ward, is:

References

External links
 Ballina Shire Council

 
Local government areas of New South Wales
1977 establishments in Australia
Northern Rivers
Ballina, New South Wales